The Moldova national under-21 football team represents Moldova in international football at this age level and is controlled by the Moldovan Football Federation, the governing body for football in Moldova. The team is considered to be the feeder team for the senior Moldovan national football team. The team competes to qualify for the UEFA European Under-21 Championship, held every two years. Since the establishment of the Moldovan under-21 team, the under-21 side has never reached a final tournament of the UEFA European Under-21 Championship, but has produced many players, who have become regular internationals for the senior side. The team is coached by Ștefan Stoica.

This team is for Moldovan players aged 21 or under at the start of a two-year European Under-21 Championship campaign, so players can be, and often are, up to 23 years old. Players born on or after 1 January 2002 are eligible for the 2025 UEFA European Under-21 Championship qualification.

Moldova U21s began their first competitive campaign in 1994, in which they tried to qualify for the 1996 finals. They eventually finished fourth in a five-team group, with two wins out of eight games. The U-21 team plays its home matches in many different venues all around the country, including Chișinău, Orhei and Tiraspol.

Competition history

UEFA U-21 European Championship

2025 UEFA European Under-21 Championship

Qualifying group stage

All-time record
Only competitive matches are included.

See also
 Moldova national football team
 Moldova national under-19 football team
 Moldova national under-17 football team

References

External links
 Moldova U-21 at uefa.com
 Moldova U-21 at soccerway

Under-21
European national under-21 association football teams
Football in Moldova